Flor de durazno is a 1945 Mexican romantic drama film directed by Miguel Zacarías, who also adapted it from the novel by Gustavo Martínez Zuviria, better known for his pen name, Hugo Wast. It stars Fernando Soler, Esther Fernández, and David Silva.

References

External links
 

1945 films
1945 romantic drama films
Mexican black-and-white films
Mexican romantic drama films
1940s Mexican films